Helmer Strømbo (19 June 1948 – 28 March 2022) was a Norwegian curler.

He was a champion of the first-ever European Curling Championships, played  and a two-time Norwegian men's curling champion.

Teams

References

External links
 
 Ni års fengsel for hasjsmugling - Dagbladet

1948 births
2022 deaths
Norwegian male curlers
European curling champions
Norwegian curling champions
Sportspeople from Oslo
20th-century Norwegian people